Stroux is a surname. Notable people with the surname include:

 Johannes Stroux (1886–1954), German classicist
 Karl Heinz Stroux (1908–1985), German actor and director

See also
 Stroud (surname)